{{speciesbox
| image = Acianthera glanduligera.jpg
| genus = Acianthera
| species = glanduligera
| authority = (Lindl.) Luer (2004)
| synonyms =
 Pleurothallis glanduligera Lindl. (1836) (Basionym)
 Pleurothallis cryptoceras Rchb.f. (1886)
 Humboldtia glanduligera (Lindl.) Kuntze (1891)
 Pleurothallis cearensis Schltr. (1921)
 Pleurothallis iguapensis Schltr. (1922)
 Pleurothallis altoserrana Hoehne (1929)
 Acianthera cearensis (Schltr.) Pridgeon & M.W. Chase (2001)
 Anathallis iguapensis (Schltr.) Pridgeon & M.W. Chase (2001)
 Acianthera cryptoceras (Rchb.f.) F. Barros (2003)
 Acianthera iguapensis (Schltr.) F. Barros (2004)
}}Acianthera glanduligera'' is a species of orchid.

References

glanduligera